Piatus of Tournai (also Piaton, Platon, Piat, Piato) (died c. 286) was a Belgian saint.  He was a native of Benevento, Italy, and is traditionally said to have been sent by the pope to evangelize the cities of Chartres and Tournai.  Tradition also states that he was ordained by Dionysios the Areopagite.  He was martyred under Maximian by having the top of his skull sliced off. He may be recognized in depictions holding the sliced portion of his skull.  Saint Eligius later discovered Piatus' relics and made a reliquary for them.

Some of his relics can be found at Chartres Cathedral.

Gallery

References

External links
Saint of the Day, October 1: Piaton at SaintPatrickDC.org
 Le Retour de Saint Piat - French page that includes pictures of the relics of Saint Piatus

Interwiki
 At the French Wikipedia, a page about "La Grande procession de Tournai", which features a picture of the relics of Saint Piatus

3rd-century births
286 deaths
People from Benevento
Belgian saints
Italian saints
3rd-century Christian martyrs
3rd-century Romans